The Subansiri River (Chayul Chu in Tibet) is a trans-Himalayan river and a tributary of the Brahmaputra River that flows through Tibet's Lhuntse County in the Shannan Prefecture, and the Indian states of Arunachal Pradesh and Assam. It is the largest tributary of the Brahmaputra contributing 7.92% of the Brahmaputra's total flow.

Name and etymology 

The name is derived from a Sanskrit word svarṇa, meaning 'gold'.

Originally the name applied to the river only after the confluence of the Chayul Chu and Tsari Chu rivers at Gelensiniak. In early maps of independent India, Tsari Chu was marked as the main Subansiri river. However, over time, the name has been transferred to Chayul Chu. Within Tibet, the rivers are named after the locations they flow from such as Loro Chu, Nye Chu, Char Chu and Chayul Chu, all of which apply to the Subansirir or its tributaries.

Course

Chayul Chu 
Chayul Chu is formed near Chayul Dzong with the merger of Nye Chu and Loro Chu.

Nye Chu originates in the Tsome County where it is called Sikung. After entering the Lhuntse County, it is called Nyel Chu or Lhuntse Shung Chu. Its valley, called Nyelto, includes important towns such as Ritang and Kyitang, the latter the capital of Lhuntse County. It flows for about 100 km before reaching Chayul Dzong.

Loro Chu is formed by the merger two headwaters: Loro Karpo Chu (or the "White Loro River") and Loro Nakpo Chu (or the "Black Loro River"). Both the rivers originate in the Tsona County, marked by passes that divide the waters of Subansiri from those of Tsona Chu. The two head streams merge near the town of Trathong. The combined river flows for about 40 km before reaching Chayul Dzong.

Chayul Chu flows for about 50 km in Tibet before entering Arunachal Pradesh near the town of Taksing. Before this, it is joined by Char Chu near the village of Lung, and Yume Chu just before entering Arunachal Pradesh.

Subansiri 
It enters India near the town of Taksing and flows east and southeast through Miri Hills, then south to the Assam Valley at Dulangmukh in Dhemaji district, where it joins the Brahmaputra River at Jamurighat in Lakhimpur district. Small tributaries of the Subansiri include Rangandi, Dikrong and Kamala.

The Subansiri lends its name to two districts in Arunachal Pradesh: Upper Subansiri and Lower Subansiri.

It contributes 7.92% of the Brahmaputra's total flow.

Tributaries

Char Chu

Tsari Chu 

Tsari Chu ("Lo River"; known as Lensi River in Arunachal Pradesh) rises near the village of Chosam in Tibet and flows east for about 25 miles till the town of Migyitun, where it turns south. It merges with the Subansiri at Gelensiniak. The district of Tsari, consisting of the Tsari Chu valley and its vicinity, is considered holy ground by the Tibetans. No animals are killed and no food is grown in these areas, with the exception of Migyitun.
The holiness comes from the Dakpa Sheri mountain peak at the centre of the Tsari district, considered the home of the Buddhist Tantric deity Demchok (Chakrasamvara) and his consort Dorje Phagmo (Vajravārāhī). The pious Tibetans used to carry out a wide circumabulation (called rongkor or "ravine circuit") around the mountain once every 12 years, during the monkey year. They traversed the valley of the Tsari Chu river until its junction with Subansiri, and returned via the Subansiri and Yume Chu valleys. The last such circumambulation took place in 1956, after which the Sino-Indian border conflict has put an end to the practice.

History 
The 1950 Assam–Tibet earthquake caused landslides blocking the flow of Subansiri at Gerukamukh. After three days the blockade broke causing a massive flash flood. Over the years flooding of the river has caused loss to livelihood and life.

Lower Subansiri Dam
The Lower Subansiri Dam or The Lower Subansiri Hydro-Electric Project is an under construction dam gravity dam on the river. The dam is seen as a problem and many organisations are protesting against it. The River is a fiction book based on the issue and displays the issue as viewed by common Assamese people through its imaginary dolphins, fishes, and human characters.

See also
 List of rivers of Assam
 Lower Subansiri Dam

Notes

References

Bibliography

External links 
 Subansiri Basin Study – Another Chapter of Environment Subversion in Northeast, South Asia Network on Dams, Rivers and People, 25 September 2013.

Rivers of Assam
Rivers of Arunachal Pradesh
Tributaries of the Brahmaputra River
Rivers of India